Kurt Wilhelm Doerry (24 September 1874 – 4 January 1947) was a German track and field athlete. He competed at the 1896 Summer Olympics in Athens and the 1900 Summer Olympics held in Paris.

Doerry was 21 years old when he competed at the 1896 Summer Olympics, there he entered three events, in the 100 metres he finished fifth in his heat, so he didn't qualify for the final. In the 400 metres, again he failed to finish in the top two in his heat so didn't qualify for the final, his final event was the 110 metres hurdles, and yet again he finished outside the top two and didn't progress to the final.

Later in 1896, Doerry won the 100 and 200 metres at the German Championships, and in 1899 he won the German titles in the 200 and 400 metres.

Doerry also competed at the 1900 Summer Olympics held in Paris, France, he entered the 100 metres, in the first round he finished second behind American Clark Leiblee so qualified for semi-final, in the semi-final he didn't finish the race.

Apart from athletics, he was also a good figure skater, cyclist and tennis player, as well as an international hockey player and a boxing referee.

In 1909, Doerry was a founding member of the Deutscher Hockey-Bund and was its first president until 1914

Doerry was also a journalist and author and worked many years for Sport Im Bild and would become editor-in-chief until World War II, he would also write many books concerning an athletic theme.

References

External links

1874 births
1947 deaths
German male sprinters
Athletes (track and field) at the 1896 Summer Olympics
19th-century sportsmen
Athletes (track and field) at the 1900 Summer Olympics
Olympic athletes of Germany
People from Wilhelmshaven
People from the Province of Hanover
Sportspeople from Lower Saxony